Coleophora solenella is a moth of the family Coleophoridae. It is found in France, Switzerland, Spain, Italy and southern Russia.

The larvae feed on Artemisia campestris. They create an almost straight, tubular silken case. It is yellow-brown and up to 20 mm long. The rear end is weakly compressed and two valved. The mouth angle is about 15°. Larvae can be found from October to June.

References

solenella
Moths of Europe
Moths described in 1859